Mikhail Alekseyevich Meandrov (22 October 1894, Moscow – 1 August 1946, Moscow) was an Imperial Russian and later Soviet officer. Taken prisoner by the Germans in World War II near Leningrad in 1941, he later became an important commander (general) in the Nazi-allied Russian Liberation Army. Taken prisoner by the Soviets, he was executed in 1946.

Early career
Meandrov graduated from an officer academy at the time of World War I. During that conflict, he fought on the Southwestern Front. He originally commanded the 37th Rifle Corps, before being reassigned to the command staff of the 6th Army in 1941. He fought around Kiev and later was taken prisoner by German Army forces near Uman.

Defection and death
Meandrov joined Lieutenant General Andrey Vlasov, a Red Army defector, in the Russian Liberation Army (Русская освободительная армия, РОА; in Latin "ROA"), and was promoted to the rank of major general. He fought with the ROA until the end of the war, and was captured by the Red Army. He was found guilty of treason and was executed in Moscow, on 1 August 1946, with eleven other ROA officers, including Vlasov.

References

External links 
  Biography
  K. M. Alexandrov, Офицерский корпус армии генерал-лейтенанта А. А. Власова 1944-1945, Moscow 2001
 Russian Wikipedia

1894 births
1946 deaths
Military personnel from Moscow
People from Moskovsky Uyezd
Expelled members of the Communist Party of the Soviet Union
Soviet colonels
Russian military personnel of World War I
Soviet military personnel of the Russian Civil War
Soviet military personnel of the Winter War
Soviet military personnel of World War II
Russian Liberation Army personnel
Executed people from Moscow
Executed military personnel
Executed Soviet people from Russia
Executed Russian collaborators with Nazi Germany
Russian people executed by the Soviet Union
People executed by the Soviet Union by hanging